Hybrid warfare is a theory of military strategy, first proposed by Frank Hoffman, which employs political warfare and blends conventional warfare, irregular warfare, and cyberwarfare
 with other influencing methods, such as fake news, diplomacy, lawfare and foreign electoral intervention. By combining kinetic operations with subversive efforts, the aggressor intends to avoid attribution or retribution. The concept of hybrid warfare has been criticized by a number of academics and practitioners due to its alleged vagueness, its disputed constitutive elements, and its alleged historical distortions.

Definition 

There is no universally-accepted definition of hybrid warfare; some debate whether the term is useful at all. Some argue that the term is too abstract and only the latest term to refer to irregular methods to counter a conventionally superior force. The abstractness of the term means that it is often used as a catch-all term for all non-linear threats.

Hybrid warfare is warfare which includes some, parts, or all of the following aspects:
 A non-standard, complex, and fluid adversary. A hybrid adversary can be state or non-state. For example, in the Israel–Hezbollah War of 2006 and the Syrian Civil War, the main adversaries are non-state entities within the state system. The non-state actors can act as proxies for countries but have independent agendas as well. For example, Iran is a sponsor of Hezbollah, but it was Hezbollah's, not Iran's, agenda that resulted in the kidnapping of Israeli troops that led to the Israel–Hezbollah War. On the other hand, Russian involvement in Ukraine (pre-2022) can be described as a traditional state actor waging a hybrid war (in addition to using a local hybrid proxy) although Russia denies involvement in the 2014 Ukraine conflict.
  Use of combination of conventional and irregular methods. Methods and tactics may include conventional capabilities, irregular tactics, irregular formations, diplomacy, politics, terrorist acts, indiscriminate violence, and criminal activity. A hybrid adversary may also use clandestine actions to avoid attribution or retribution. The methods are used simultaneously across the spectrum of conflict with a unified strategy. A current example is the Islamic State's transnational aspirations, blended tactics, structured formations, and cruel use of terrorism as part of its arsenal.
 Flexible and quick response. For example, the Islamic State's response to the US aerial bombing campaign was a quick reduction of the use of checkpoints, of large convoys, and of cellphones. Militants also dispersed among the civilian population. Civilian collateral damage from airstrikes can be used as an effective recruiting tool.
 Use of advanced weapons systems and other disruptive technologies. Such weapons can be now bought at bargain prices. Moreover, other novel technologies are being adapted to the battlefield such as cellular networks. In 2006 Hezbollah was armed with high-tech weaponry, such as precision-guided missiles, which nation-states typically use. Hezbollah forces shot down Israeli helicopters, severely damaged a patrol boat with a cruise missile, and destroyed heavily-armored tanks by firing guided missiles from hidden bunkers. It also used aerial drones to gather intelligence, communicated with encrypted cellphones, and watched Israeli troop movements with thermal night-vision equipment.
 Use of mass communication for propaganda. The growth of mass communication networks offers powerful propaganda and recruiting tools. The use of fake-news websites to spread false stories is a possible element of hybrid warfare.
 Three distinct battlefields. They are the conventional battlefield, the indigenous population of the conflict zone, and the international community.

Other definitions 
The Chief of Staff of the US Army defined a hybrid threat as an adversary that incorporates "diverse and dynamic combinations of conventional, irregular, terrorist and criminal capabilities." The US Joint Forces Command defines a hybrid threat as "any adversary that simultaneously and adaptively employs a tailored mix of conventional, irregular, terrorism and criminal means or activities in the operational battle space. Rather than a single entity, a hybrid threat or challenger may be a combination of state and nonstate actors."

The US Army defined a hybrid threat in 2011 as "the diverse and dynamic combination of regular forces, irregular forces, criminal elements, or a combination of these forces and elements all unified to achieve mutually benefiting effects." NATO uses the term to describe "adversaries with the ability to simultaneously employ conventional and non-conventional means adaptively in pursuit of their objectives."

The former US Army Chief George W. Casey Jr. talked of a new type of war that would become increasingly common in the future: "A hybrid of irregular warfare and conventional warfare." According to the 2017-inaugurated European Centre of Excellence for Countering Hybrid Threats, "hybrid threats are methods and activities that are targeted towards vulnerabilities of the opponent" where the "range of methods and activities is wide".

Relation to the grey-zone 

The concept of grey-zone conflicts or warfare is distinct from the concept of hybrid warfare, although the two are intimately linked as in the modern era states most often apply unconventional tools and hybrid techniques in the grey-zone. However many of the unconventional tools used by states in the grey-zone such as propaganda campaigns, economic pressure, and the use of non-state entities do not cross over the threshold into formalized state-level aggression.

Effectiveness 

Traditional militaries find it hard to respond to hybrid warfare since it is hard to agree on the source of the conflict. An article published in Global Security Review, "What is Hybrid Warfare?" compares the notion of hybrid warfare to the Russian concept of "non-linear" warfare, which it defines as the deployment of "conventional and irregular military forces in conjunction with psychological, economic, political, and cyber assaults." The article partially attributes the difficulty to the "rigid" or static military taxonomy used by NATO to define the very concept of warfare.

To counter a hybrid threat, hard power is often insufficient. Often, the conflict evolves under the radar, and even a "rapid" response turns out to be too late. Overwhelming force is an insufficient deterrent. Many traditional militaries lack the flexibility to shift tactics, priorities, and objectives constantly.

History 
When going through the work of philosophers who dealt with propaganda and governance in the last 3,000 years, one can find that hybrid war is not a new concept as many social anthropologists believe today. The combination of conventional and irregular methods is not new and has been used throughout history. A few examples of that type of combat are found in the American Revolutionary War (a combination of George Washington's Continental Army with militia forces) and the Napoleonic Wars (British regulars co-operated with Spanish guerrillas).

One can find examples of hybrid warfare in smaller conflicts during the 19th century. For instance, between 1837 and 1840, Rafael Carrera, a Conservative peasant rebel leader in Guatemala, waged a successful military campaign against the Liberals and the federal government of Central America by using a strategy that combined classical guerrilla tactics with conventional operations. Carrera's hybrid approach to warfare gave him the edge over his numerically-superior and better-armed enemies.

The Soviet Union engaged in an early case of hybrid warfare in 1944. When the Tuvan Army was away in  Europe, fighting along the Red Army against the Third Reich, Moscow annexed the Tuvan People's Republic by pressing the Tuvan government to ask for joining the Soviet Union.

After 1945 
The Vietnam War saw hybrid warfare tactics employed by both sides, with the US using the CIA to support civil war parties in Laos and the Cambodian Civil War as well as ethnic groups inside Vietnam for its cause and the Soviet Union supported the Viet Cong militia.

After 1989 
The end of the Cold War created a unipolar system with a preponderant American military power. Though that has tempered traditional conflicts, regional conflicts and threats that leverage the weaknesses of conventional military structures are becoming more frequent.

At the same time, the sophistication and the lethality of non-state actors has increased. They are well armed with technologically advanced weapons, which are now available at low prices. Similarly, commercial technologies such as cellphones and digital networks are being adapted to the battlefield. Another new element is the ability of non-state actors to persist within the modern system.

Modern examples

2006 Israel–Hezbollah War 
One of the most often quoted examples of a hybrid war is the 2006 conflict between Israel and Hezbollah. Hezbollah is a sophisticated non-state actor that is sponsored by Iran. While the group often acts as a proxy for Iran, it has its agenda. It was Hezbollah's policy, rather than Iran's, that led to the kidnapping of Israeli troops, which was the impetus for the war. The war featured about 3,000 Hezbollah fighters embedded in the local population attacked by about 30,000 Israeli regular troops.

The group used decentralized cells composed of guerrillas and regular troops, armed with weaponry that nation-states use, such as anti-tank missiles, rockets, armed unmanned aerial vehicles, and advanced improvised explosive devices. Hezbollah cells downed Israeli helicopters, damaged Merkava IV tanks, communicated with encrypted cell phones, and monitored Israeli troops movements with night vision and thermal imaging devices. Iranian Quds Force operatives acted as mentors and suppliers of advanced systems.

Hezbollah leveraged mass communication immediately distributing battlefield photos and videos dominating the perception battle throughout the conflict. Israel did not lose the war on the battlefield but lost the information battle, as the overwhelming perception  then of Israeli defeat.

2014 ISIL advance into Iraq 
The Islamic State of Iraq and the Levant (ISIL) is a non-state actor that uses hybrid tactics against the conventional Iraqi military. ISIL has transitional aspirations and uses irregular and regular tactics and terrorism. In response, Iraq turned to hybrid tactics itself by using non-state and international actors to counter the ISIL advance. The United States was a hybrid participant and used a combination of traditional air power, advisers to Iraqi government troops, Kurdish peshmerga, sectarian militias; it also trained opposition forces within Syria. The hybrid war is a conflict with an interconnected group of state and non-state actors pursuing overlapping goals and a weak local state.

Russian activities in the 2010s 

The Russian government's wide use in conflicts the Syrian Civil War and the Russo-Ukrainian War, of private military contractors such as those of the Wagner Group was in 2018 singled out by experts as a key part of Russia's strategy of hybrid warfare to advance its interests and obfuscating its involvement and role. Specifically, Russia employed a combination of traditional combat warfare, economic influence, cyber strategies, and disinformation attacks against Ukraine.

Regarding Russia, Jānis Bērziņš, the director of the Center for Security and Strategic Research, has widely published to argue that using the term "hybrid" to characterize the Russian strategy is misleading since Russia has its own definitions and concepts: "the word 'hybrid' is catchy since it can represent a mix of anything. However, its basic framework differs from the one developed by the Russians due to the former being a military concept and the result of American military thought. Moreover, the concept of New Generation Warfare includes conventional operations. In other words, Hybrid Warfare might be part of New Generation Warfare but cannot define it."

Michael Kofman, a senior research scientist at CNA and a fellow at the Wilson Center's Kennan Institute, noted in March 2018 that the West′s frequent references to hybrid warfare were in effect "an unintelligible Western reaction, after decades of wars of choice against paltry adversaries, to confrontation with another power that is capable across the full spectrum of conflict."

Russia's activities in the former Soviet states have been described as Hobbesian and redolent of Cold War thinking.

General Philip Breedlove, in a US Senate hearing in February 2016, claimed that Russia is using refugees to weaken Europe and is directing the influx of refugees to destabilize areas and regions in terms of economy and to create social unrest. On 10 February 2016, Finnish Defence Minister Jussi Niinistö told a meeting of NATO Defence Ministers that Finland expects Russia to open a second front, with as many as 1 million migrants possibly arriving over the Finnish-Russian border. A similar statement was made by Ilkka Kanerva, Finland's former foreign minister and now the chairman of the country's parliamentary Defense Committee.

United States on Russian activities 
Moscow has accused Washington of conducting hybrid warfare against Russia during the colour revolutions. Its perception of being at war or in a permanent state of conflict with the US and its allies was furthered by the 2014 Maidan uprising in Ukraine.

Speaking at the Valdai Discussion Club in November 2014, Russian Foreign Minister Sergey Lavrov said:

Iranian activities in the 2010s 

Iran has been accused of conducting hybrid warfare. According to the BBC, "Iran, along with its Houthi allies [in Yemen], is conducting a classic war of the weak against the strong; a "hybrid conflict" as it is known in the strategic textbooks. It is borrowing many of the tactics from the Russian play-book – the use of deniability; proxies; cyber-operations and information warfare."

Iran perceptions of US 

The US was accused in 2019 by Ali Shamkhani, secretary of Iran's Supreme National Security Council, of conducting hybrid warfare against Iran and other countries.

Saudi and Emirati activities in the 2010s 

Saudi Arabia and United Arab Emirates have been accused of conducting hybrid warfare against Qatar.

Chinese activities 

China has been accused of conducting hybrid warfare against Taiwan and in the South China Sea.

Belarusian activities in 2021 

Poland and the Baltic states have accused Belarus of conducting hybrid warfare against the European Union by organizing illegal border crossings with migrants into Latvia, Lithuania and Poland with the aim of destabilizing the 27-nation bloc.

See also 

 Active measures
 Asymmetric warfare
 Nicaragua v. United States
 Sri Lankan Civil War
 Critical infrastructure protection
 Proactive cyber defence
 Unconventional warfare
 Corporate warfare
 Economic warfare
 Psychological warfare
 Political warfare
 Organized crime
 
 Internet manipulation
 Accelerated pluralism
 Destabilisation
 European Centre of Excellence for Countering Hybrid Threats
 Cabbage tactics
 Unit 29155

References

Further reading 

 
 

Vision-Alonzo, G. (2017). The Carrera Revolt and "Hybrid Warfare" in Nineteenth Century Central America. London: Palgrave Macmillan. .

External links 

U.S. GAO – Hybrid Warfare
MunichSecurityReport2015 section 3

Warfare by type
Warfare post-1945
Political science
Military science
Military doctrines
Military strategy